Marziale Carpinoni (c. 1644–1722) was an Italian painter of the Baroque period. Born in Clusone, he was the grandson of Domenico Carpinoni. Carpinoni received his initial training in art first by his father, then by his grandfather. He was afterwards sent to Rome to the school of Ciro Ferri. He painted historical subjects. In the principal church at Clusone is the Virgin and Child, with Saints and The Baptism of Christ by St. John. For the cathedral at Bergamo he painted images of SS. Domno, Domneone, and Eusebia. He also painted pictures for the churches in Brescia. He died at Ferrara.

References

1644 births
1722 deaths
People from Clusone
17th-century Italian painters
Italian male painters
18th-century Italian painters
Italian Baroque painters
18th-century Italian male artists